The Turbomeca Palouste is a French gas turbine engine, first run in 1952. Designed purely as a compressed air generator, the Palouste was mainly used as a ground-based aircraft engine starter unit. Other uses included rotor tip propulsion for helicopters.

Design and development
Designed and built by Turbomeca, the Palouste was also built under license in Britain by Blackburn and Rolls-Royce. Originally conceived as an aircraft ground support equipment starter gas generator, it was used also as propulsion for the Sud-Ouest Djinn and other tip-jet powered helicopters.

The Palouste was a very simple unit, its primary purpose being to supply a high flow rate of compressed air to start larger jet engines such as the Rolls-Royce Spey as installed in the Blackburn Buccaneer (this aircraft having no onboard starting system). Air from the centrifugal compressor was divided between external supply (known as bleed air) and its own combustion chamber.

Several British naval aircraft were adapted to carry a Palouste in a wing-mounted air starter pod installation to facilitate engine starting when away from base.
 
A novel use of a surplus Palouste engine was its installation in a custom-built motorcycle known as the Boost Palouste. The builder modified the engine to include a primitive afterburner device and noted that pitch changes which occurred during braking and acceleration caused gyroscopic precession handling effects due to the rotating mass of the engine.

Variants
Palouste IVThe gas generator used to power the Sud-Ouest S.O.1221 Djinn and other tip-jet  helicopters.
Palouste IVB
Palouste IVC
Palouste IVD
Palouste IVE
Palouste IVF
Palouste 502 (P.102 and P.104) Blackburn / Bristol Siddeley / Rolls-Royce production for air-starter units.
Autan A development of the Palouste delivering a higher mass flow of compressed air.
Autan 2 1 x axial + 1 x centrifugal compressor stages

Applications
Bell Model 65
Fairey Ultra-light Helicopter
Sud-Ouest Djinn

Specifications (Palouste 4)

See also

References

Further reading

External links

Turbomeca website
Palouste and Artouste

Palouste
Aircraft gas generator engines
Centrifugal-flow gas turbine engines